Aesthetic Realism is a philosophy founded by Eli Siegel in 1941.

Aesthetic realism may also refer to:

 Aesthetic realism (arts), the attempt to represent subject matter truthfully without artificiality
 Aesthetic realism (metaphysics), the claim that there are mind-independent aesthetic facts